The 2011 season was Club de Regatas Vasco da Gama's 113th year in existence, the club's 96th season in existence of football, and the club's 40th season playing in the Brasileirão Série A, the top flight of Brazilian football, having been out only in 2009, after a relegation from top division in 2008, backing in 2010.

Vasco da Gama finished Brasileirão Série A as runners-up, 2 points behind winners Corinthians, in a title decided in last round, when Corinthians draw 0–0 against Palmeiras and Vasco da Gama draw 1–1 against Flamengo. Vasco da Gama in Copa Sudamericana goes at semifinals, after a 1–3 aggregate loss against eventual winners Universidad de Chile. Vasco da Gama won their first Copa do Brasil title, after an epic finals against Coritiba, winning in away goals rule after a 3–3 aggregate draw. Vasco da Gama finished Rio de Janeiro State Championship in 6th place, after a fall in group stage of Taça Guanabara and a runners-up against Flamengo in Taça Rio in a 1–3 penalty loss after a 0–0 draw.

Club

Coaching staff
Updated 2 November 2011.

Other personnel

Players

First-team squad

Youth players able to play on first team

Out of loan

Squad information

from Vasco da Gama (U–20) 
able to play in first team

Out of loan

Transfers

In

Loan in

On trial (in)

Out

Loan out

On trial (out)

Statistics

Squad appearances and goals 

|-
! colspan=14 style=background:#dcdcdc; text-align:center| Goalkeepers

|-
! colspan=14 style=background:#dcdcdc; text-align:center| Defenders

|-
! colspan=14 style=background:#dcdcdc; text-align:center| Midfielders

|-
! colspan=14 style=background:#dcdcdc; text-align:center| Forwards

|-
! colspan=14 style=background:#dcdcdc; text-align:center| Players of youth squads who have made an appearance or had a squad number this season 

|-
! colspan=14 style=background:#dcdcdc; text-align:center| Players who have made an appearance or had a squad number this season but have transferred or loaned out during the season

|}

Top scorers
Includes all competitive matches

Clean sheets
Includes all competitive matches

Overall

{|class="wikitable"
|-
|Games played || 74 (17 Rio State League, 11 Copa do Brasil, 8 Copa Sudamericana, 38 Série A)
|-
|Games won || 35 (8 Rio State League, 5 Copa do Brasil, 3 Copa Sudamericana, 19 Série A)
|-
|Games drawn || 22 (4 Rio State League, 5 Copa do Brasil, 1 Copa Sudamericana, 12 Série A)
|-
|Games lost || 16 (5 Rio State League, 1 Copa do Brasil, 4 Copa Sudamericana, 7 Série A)
|-
|Goals scored || 131
|-
|Goals conceded || 77
|-
|Goal difference || +54
|-
|Best result || 9-0 (A) v America-RJ – Rio State League – 2011
|-
|Worsts results || 0-4 (A) v Botafogo / 1-5 (A) v Coritiba – Série A – 2011
|-
|Most appearances || Fernando Prass (74 appearances)
|-
|Top scorer || Bernardo (18 goals)
|-

Competitions

Pre-season friendlies

Rio de Janeiro State Championship

Guanabara Cup

Matches

Rio Cup

Matches

Knockout stage matches

Copa do Brasil

Matches

Brasileirão Série A

Standings

Results summary 

Pld=Matches played; W=Matches won; D=Matches drawn; L=Matches lost;

Results by round

Matches

Copa Sudamericana

Squad 
As of 23 November 2011, according to combined sources on the official website.

In Conmebol competitions players must be assigned numbers between 1 and 25.

¹ – Nílton replaced Felipe, Patric replaced Kim and Douglas replaced Anderson Martins after the Second Phase.² – Leandro Chaparro replaced Rômulo and Kim replaced Victor Ramos after the Round of 16.³ – Rômulo replaced Éder Luís, Felipe replaced Nílton and Nílton replaced Márcio Careca after the Quarterfinals.

Matches

Starting XI

Honors

Individuals

IFFHS ranking
Vasco da Gama position on the Club World Ranking during the 2011 season, according to IFFHS.

References 

CR Vasco da Gama
Club de Regatas Vasco da Gama seasons
Vasco da Gama